Anthophila decolorana is a moth in the family Choreutidae. It was described by Aleksandr Sergeievich Danilevsky in 1969. It is found in Georgia and Russia.

References

Choreutidae
Moths described in 1969
Moths of Asia
Moths of Europe